The German Chancery (German: Deutsche Kanzlei), also known as the Hanoverian Chancery, was the official name given to the office of the Hanoverian ministry in London during the years of personal union between Great Britain (later the United Kingdom of Great Britain and Ireland) and the Electorate of Hanover (later the Kingdom of Hanover) from 1714 until 1837. The office ceased upon the accession of Queen Victoria in the United Kingdom and King Ernest Augustus in Hanover in 1837.

Functions and duties 
The primary duty of the Hanoverian minister in London was to transmit memoranda between the Privy Council of Hanover and the Elector of Hanover, who was the king of Great Britain. During the reigns of George I, George II, and most of the active reign of George III, the ministers held few other duties, working in two small rooms within St James's Palace. Politically, the ministers held little power in Hanover or in Great Britain throughout the eighteenth century.

Unlike the many ministers in Hanover, however, the minister in London was required to have an in-depth knowledge of the British political system and the current opinions of the two major political parties – namely the Tory and Whig factions – and most importantly, he had constant and direct access to the Elector. As the position matured, namely during the French Revolutionary Wars, it became more politically responsible, especially under the administration of Ernst zu Münster, who worked tirelessly to make the Hanoverian cause known to the British people. He was rewarded with the expansion of Hanover's borders and the elevation of the electorate to a kingdom during the Congress of Vienna in 1814. While the final minister achieved little recognition in comparison, the post had become all but defunct by the 1830s as the union between the crowns was reaching its inevitable end. The last minister returned to Hanover in 1837 with Ernest Augustus, the new Hanoverian king, and the post was thereafter unnecessary. The records of the chancery are now located in the state archives of Hanover.

Hanoverian Envoys in London 
Prior to the Hanoverian succession but following the Glorious Revolution in 1688, a Hanoverian minister was resident in London as an emissary to English court for the rights and claims of Sophia, Electress of Hanover to the English succession. The position survived until the death of Bothmer in 1732, although most of the functions of the office had been assumed by the Chancery. The known Hanoverian envoys are:
 Ludwig Justus Sinold von Schütz (1689–1713)
 Thomas Grote, Baron von Grote (1713)
 Georg Wilhelm Sinold von Schütz (1713–1714)
 C. F. Kreyenberg (1714)
 Hans Caspar von Bothmer (1714–1732)

Heads of the German Chancery in London 
The records for the ministers now reside in Hanover so there is some uncertainty about the succession of the heads of the German Chancery. It is certain that after the retirement of Bernstorff in 1720, there were multiple heads of the Chancery. This practice ended after Bothmer's death in 1732. The probable succession of ministers in London is as follows:

References

External links

Kingdom of Hanover
People from the Electorate of Hanover
People from the Kingdom of Hanover

House of Hanover
Germany–United Kingdom relations
1714 establishments in Great Britain